Melanophryniscus sanmartini (common name: San Martin redbelly toad) is a species of toad in the family Bufonidae. It is found in Uruguay and southernmost Brazil (Rio Grande do Sul). Its natural habitats are grasslands and rocky outcrops. Reproduction takes place in small streams. 
It is threatened by habitat loss caused by exotic tree plantations.

References

Further reading
 
 
 

sanmartini
Amphibians of Brazil
Amphibians of Uruguay
Amphibians described in 1968
Taxonomy articles created by Polbot